Rho Phoenicis (ρ Phoenicis) is a variable star in the constellation of Phoenix.

This star is classified as an F-type giant with a spectral type of F3III, and in the HR diagram it occupies in the lower part of the instability strip. Rho Phoenicis is Delta Scuti variable, changing its visual apparent magnitude between 5.17 and 5.27 with a period of around 0.1–0.2 days. The pulsation period seems to vary in a timescale of weeks, which indicates the star is not a simple radial pulsator. The analysis of the temperature variations over the pulsation cycles also supports this conclusion. It is not clear if the pulsation period really is variable, or if the light curve is simply the sum of multiple stable pulsation frequencies.

Stellar evolution models indicate that Rho Phoenicis has about 2.1 times the solar mass and an age of around 1 billion years. This star is shining with 36 times the solar luminosity and has an effective temperature of 6,900 K. Its metallicity is high, with an overall metal abundance 25% greater the solar value. Gaia Data Release 2 discovered a star with the same proper motion and parallax as Rho Phoenicis. It has an apparent magnitude of 14.6 (G band) and is at a separation of 7.9 arcseconds.

References

Delta Scuti variables
Phoenix (constellation)
F-type giants
Durchmusterung objects
004919
003949
0242